Barbara Strasen (born Barbara Ehrlich, August 12, 1943) is an American artist who works with painting, photography, digital technologies and installations. She is known for her use of layers and layering techniques. She has exhibited widely in galleries and museums, nationally and internationally. In 2015 she had a major retrospective at the Long Beach Museum of Art.

Early life and education 
Barbara Ehrlich was born in Brooklyn, New York. She attended Great Neck North High School. In 1960, she left New York to major in art at Carnegie-Mellon University in Pittsburgh, PA. There, she studied with Robert Lepper, whose teaching on semiotics had a profound effect on the artist. She received a fellowship to attend the Yale Summer School of Art (1962). She was awarded a BFA in 1963. The following year, she married Stephen Strasen, a mathematician, who later became a computer software developer. She went on to graduate study in painting with Hassel Smith and Elmer Bischoff at the University of California, Berkeley, earning an MFA in 1965.

Career 
After graduate school, Strasen began a kind of hybrid form of imagemaking, often combining painting with painted cutouts, to which she has cycled back often during her career. The young artist soon exhibited at San Francisco's influential Dilexi Gallery directed by Jim Newman. Strasen began teaching on the college level at a number of California institutions, including the University of California, San Diego, and the Richmond Art Center.

In 1975 her work was included in the Whitney Museum’s Biennial. This was followed by exhibitions at venues such as the Santa Barbara Museum, and Louis K. Meisel and Parsons/Dreyfuss  galleries in New York City. In 1980, Strasen included some of these as an individual project installation at P.S.1 in Queens, and a solo exhibition at the San Diego Natural History Museum.

In the decade that followed, she continued her focus on the natural world with a series about the desert. Her work was beginning to be shown in venues worldwide, including the Museu de Arte Contemporânea in Brazil, La Chambre Blanche in Quebec, Steirischer Herbst in Austria, the Fisher Art Museum in Los Angeles and AIR Gallery in New York City.

The next ten years saw Strasen moving her focus to finding connections between contemporary and ancient forms. Exhibitions were mounted at Grey Art Gallery and the Islip Art Museum in New York, Het Apollohuis in the Netherlands, Budapest Galerie in Hungary, Frauenmuseum in Germany, Galeria Soloblu in Milan and the FlashArt Museum in Trevi, Italy. She also co-curated, with Mary-Kay Lombino (then Assistant Curator at the UCLA-Hammer Museum), the exhibition, “Contempo-Italianate,” at Loyola Marymount University’s Laband Gallery.

The fascination with all that "stuff," along with its semiotic potential, eventually led Strasen to a new medium, lenticular printing, and to extensive collaboration with her husband, who provided technical support. The lenticular process is capable of merging multiple images into a single panel, allowing visuals to shift as spectators move. In 2002 she created a lenticular work that covered the ceiling of the newly designed Sylmar branch library in Los Angeles (working with the architects Hodgetts + Fung).

The largest of these lenticular pieces, a 56-panel wall installation titled Flow and Glimpse was commissioned for Los Angeles International Airport, Terminal 2 where it went on view in 2013.

As of 2022, she maintains a studio in San Pedro, California.

Collections 
Her work is included in many private and public collections, including the National Gallery of Art (Washington, DC); the Wellcome Trust Art Collection (London); the Colburn School of Music Art Collection (Los Angeles); the Long Beach Museum of Art; the Santa Barbara Museum of Art; the Austin Art Museum; the Frauenmuseum (Bonn, Germany); the Allen Memorial Art Museum; the Blanton Museum/University of Texas (Austin) and the collection of Herbert and Dorothy Vogel.

Notes

References

External links 
 Barbara Strasen’s website
 Susan Eley Fine Art
 George Billis Gallery

American women artists
1943 births
Living people
American contemporary painters
American collage artists
21st-century American women